Bert Teuchert (born 1 September 1966) is a German boxer. He competed in the men's heavyweight event at the 1992 Summer Olympics.

References

External links
 

1966 births
Living people
German male boxers
Olympic boxers of Germany
Boxers at the 1992 Summer Olympics
Sportspeople from Freiburg im Breisgau
AIBA World Boxing Championships medalists
Heavyweight boxers